The 1993–94 season is the 70th season in the existence of Rayo Vallecano and the club's first season back in the top flight of Spanish football. In addition to the domestic league, Rayo Vallecano participated in this season's edition of the Copa del Rey.

Summary
During summer Jose Antonio Camacho left the club after the end of his contract to take the charge of RCD Español prompting José María Ruiz-Mateos to appoint club legend Felines as its new head coach. The club transferred in several players such as Pichichi trophy 5-times-winner Hugo Sanchez seeking to replace Anton Polster who was transferred out to FC Köln, midfielder Orehuela from Atletico Madrid, Onesimo and young striker Ismael Urzaiz from Celta Vigo.

After a bad streak of results, President Ruiz Mateos sacked head coach Felines and appointed Fernando Zambrano on 31 October 1993  however, the squad still lost the path in League even with the appointing of Teresa Rivero as new club President, the first woman in that charge in La Liga history who fired Zambrano on 4 February 1994 replacing him with David Vidal for the rest of the season. The team felt below to a Relegation Playoff against SD Compostela descending to 1994-95 Segunda Division after three matches.

Squad

Transfers

Competitions

La Liga

League table

Results by round

Matches

Relegation playoff

Copa del Rey

Third round

Fourth round

Statistics

Player statistics

References

Rayo Vallecano seasons
Rayo Vallecano